Conte Verde may refer to:

 Amadeus VI, Count of Savoy, nicknamed "Il Conte Verde", a Count of Savoy 
 SS Conte Verde, an Italian ocean liner
 Italian ironclad Conte Verde, a Principe di Carignano-class ironclads of the Italian Regia Marina